Clubland are a series of compilation albums from Clubland released by Universal Music TV and All Around the World Productions.

Series overview

See also
 Clubland X-Treme Hardcore (compilation series)
 Clubland (dance brand)

References

External links

Dance-pop compilation albums
2000s compilation albums
Clubland (dance brand) albums